Beregovoy may refer to:

People

 Georgy Beregovoy, Soviet cosmonaut of Ukrainian descent
 Mikhail Beregovoy, Soviet Air Defence Forces officer
 Pierre Bérégovoy, French Prime Minister from 1992 to 1993

Places

 Beregovoy Camp Directorate Gulag
 Beregovoy, Russia